The Kayapó Indigenous Territory is an indigenous territory located in Pará, Brazil.

Location

It is inhabited by the Kayapó people.
As of 1990 Funai reported that the population was 1,946.
In 2014 Siasi/Sesai reported that the population was 4,548.

History

The Kayapó Indigenous Territory was declared by decree 92.244 of 9 May 1985.
The homologation was by decree 316 of 29 October 1991.

References

Sources

Kayapo people
Uncontacted peoples
Indigenous Territories (Brazil)
Indigenous topics of the Amazon
Protected areas established in 1991
1991 establishments in Brazil
Protected areas of Pará